"Liberate" is a single by Swedish DJ and producer Eric Prydz. The song was released as a digital download on 21 March 2014 as the second single from his debut studio album Opus (2016). The song was written by Eric Prydz and Tom Cane. It peaked at number 71 on the UK Singles Chart. The song achieved worldwide recognition when it became the title song of Forza Horizon 2.

Music video
A music video to accompany the release of "Liberate" was first released onto YouTube on 12 June 2014 at a total length of three minutes and three seconds. As of April 2016, it has received over three million views.

Track listing

Charts

Release history

References

2014 songs
Eric Prydz songs
Songs written by Eric Prydz